Fort Raleigh National Historic Site preserves the location of Roanoke Colony, the first English settlement in the present-day United States. The site was preserved for its national significance in relation to the founding of the first English settlement in North America in 1587.  The colony, which was promoted and backed by entrepreneurs led by Englishman Sir Walter Raleigh (ca. 1554–1618), failed sometime between 1587 and 1590 when supply ships failed to arrive on time.  When next visited, the settlement was abandoned with no survivors found. The fate of the "Lost Colony" was a celebrated mystery, although most modern academic sources agree that the settlers likely assimilated into local indigenous tribes.

The visitor center's museum contains exhibits about the history of the English expeditions and colonies, the Roanoke Colony, and the island's Civil War history and Freedmen's Colony (1863-1867).

History
The Union Army occupied the island in 1862 and soon established a contraband camp for slave refugees. It founded the Roanoke Island Freedmen's Colony in 1863 to be self-sustaining. The free residents of the colony were allocated plots of land by household, paid by the Army for work, and educated with the help of Northern teachers. By 1864 the colony had more than 2200 freedpeople as residents. It had a sawmill, fisheries and 600 cabins. More than 150 freedmen from the colony were among the nearly 4000 freedmen from North Carolina who served with the United States Colored Troops.  The colony is commemorated with a marble monument erected at the fort site in 2001 by Dare County.

The Fort Raleigh historic site is home to Paul Green's outdoor symphonic drama, The Lost Colony. This work about the earliest colonists has been performed in the Waterside Theatre during the summer since 1937, with an interlude during World War II.  It is presented by the Roanoke Island Historical Association.

Administrative history

Fort Raleigh National Historic Site was established on April 5, 1941, through a transfer of property to the National Park Service under a cooperative agreement with the Roanoke Island Historical Association (RIHA) and Acting Secretary of the Interior Alvin J. Wirtz, using authority provided under the Historic Sites Act of 1935.  As with all historic areas administered by the National Park Service, the site was listed on the National Register of Historic Places on October 15, 1966.

Fort Raleigh is co-managed with two other Outer Banks parks, Wright Brothers National Memorial and Cape Hatteras National Seashore.  It is the location of the group headquarters at the northern end of Roanoke Island.  The cooperative agreement of 1941 allows RIHA to stage theatrical performances in the Waterside Theatre, also on park property.

Elizabethan Gardens

Within the historic site are the Elizabethan Gardens, managed by the Garden Club of North Carolina, created as a memorial to the first colonists and as an example of a period garden. There is a separate fee for the gardens.

Over 500 species of plants are artfully tended on 10.5 acres of scenic waterfront property. This beautiful Outer Banks attraction was built in the mid 20th century to honor Queen Elizabeth I. Stepping into the Elizabethan Gardens is like stepping into a time machine. History buffs and horticulturists alike will enjoy the Renaissance statues hidden throughout the garden and the intricate Elizabethan-style buildings. The garden is open daily year round and holds seasonal events such as educational tours in the summer and holiday light displays in the winter. The attraction is also a popular Outer Banks wedding venue thanks to its romantic ambiance and idyllic views.

References

 The National Parks: Index 2001–2003. Washington: U.S. Department of the Interior.

External links

 Official NPS site: Fort Raleigh National Historic Site
 Roanoke Island Historical Association: The Lost Colony drama
 The Elizabethan Gardens

Buildings and structures in Dare County, North Carolina
Raleigh
National Historic Sites in North Carolina
History of the Thirteen Colonies
Museums in Dare County, North Carolina
History museums in North Carolina
Protected areas established in 1941
Raleigh
Raleigh
Protected areas of Dare County, North Carolina
Raleigh
National Register of Historic Places in Dare County, North Carolina
Works Progress Administration in North Carolina
Roanoke Colony
American Civil War on the National Register of Historic Places